The 2014 UNLV Rebels football team represented the University of Nevada, Las Vegas during the 2014 NCAA Division I FBS football season. The Rebels were led by fifth year head coach Bobby Hauck and played their home games at Sam Boyd Stadium. They were members of the West Division of the Mountain West Conference. They finished the season 2–11, 1–7 in Mountain West play to finish in last place in the West Division.

At the end of the season, head coach Bobby Hauck resigned. He posted a record of 15–49 in five seasons and in 2013 took the Rebels to their first bowl game since 2000.

Schedule

Schedule Source:

Game summaries

at Arizona

In their first game of the season, the Rebels lost, 58–13 to the Arizona Wildcats.

Northern Colorado

In their second game of the season, the Rebels won, 13–12 over the Northern Colorado Bears.

Northern Illinois

In their third game of the season, the Rebels lost, 48–34 to the Northern Illinois Huskies.

at Houston

In their fourth game of the season, the Rebels lost, 47–14 to the Houston Cougars.

at San Diego State

In their fifth game of the season, the Rebels lost, 34–17 to the San Diego State Aztecs.

at San Jose State

In their sixth game of the season, the Rebels lost, 33–10 to the San Jose State Spartans.

Fresno State

In their seventh game of the season, the Rebels won, 30–27, in overtime, over the Fresno State Bulldogs.

at Utah State

In their eighth game of the season, the Rebels lost, 34–20, to the Utah State Aggies.

New Mexico

In their ninth game of the season, the Rebels lost, 31–28, to the New Mexico Lobos.

Air Force

In their tenth game of the season, the Rebels lost, 48–21, to the Air Force Falcons.

at BYU

In their eleventh game of the season, the Rebels lost, 42–23, to the BYU Cougars.

at Hawaii

In their twelfth game of the season, the Rebels lost, 37–35, to the Hawaii Rainbow Warriors.

Nevada

In their thirteenth game of the season, the Rebels lost, 49–27, to the Nevada Wolf Pack.

References

UNLV
UNLV Rebels football seasons
UNLV Rebels football